Buk is a municipality and village in Prachatice District in the South Bohemian Region of the Czech Republic. It has about 300 inhabitants.

Administrative parts
Villages of Včelná pod Boubínem and Vyšovatka are administrative parts of Buk.

References

Villages in Prachatice District
Bohemian Forest